The 2016–17 Scottish Youth Cup was the 34th season of the Scottish Youth Cup, the national knockout tournament at youth level organised by the Scottish Football Association for its full and associate member clubs. The tournament was for the under-20 age group, to complement current youth development strategies, having formerly been an under-19 competition. Players born after 1 January 1997 are eligible to play.

Motherwell were the defending champions after they beat Heart of Midlothian 5–2 in the 2016 final.

Calendar

Format
The sixteen clubs who reached the fourth round of the 2015–16 competition receive a bye to the third round of this season's tournament. The remaining thirty-nine clubs enter the first round and are initially divided into three regional groups to reduce travelling. The tournament becomes an all-in national competition from the third round onwards.

First round
The draw for the first and second rounds took place on 3 August 2016. The following clubs were involved in the first round draw:

North Section
Three ties was drawn in this group with the following clubs receiving a bye to the second round:

Montrose
Formartine United
Forfar Athletic
Buckie Thistle
Clachnacuddin
Banks O' Dee
Lossiemouth

The dates for the first round ties were announced on 26 August 2016.

Central Section

Four ties were drawn in this group with all the following clubs receiving byes to the second round:

Albion Rovers
Spartans
Hamilton Academical
Cowdenbeath
Hibernian
East Kilbride
Falkirk
Raith Rovers
Lothian Thistle Hutchison Vale
Edinburgh City
Stirling Albion
Tynecastle
Livingston
BSC Glasgow
Whitehill Welfare
Preston Athletic

The dates for the first round ties were announced on 26 August 2016.

Second round

North Section

Central Section

South Section

Third round
The following sixteen clubs entered at this stage by virtue of having reached the fourth round of last season's competition:

Final

External links
Youth Cup on Scottish FA website

References

5
Scottish Youth Cup seasons